Šetkić is a Bosnian surname. Notable people with the surname include:

 Aldin Šetkić (born 1987), Bosnian tennis player
 Tina Šetkić (born 1999), French guitarrist of Yugoslav descent

Bosnian surnames